"You'll Be in My Heart" is a song by English drummer and singer Phil Collins from the 1999 Disney animated feature Tarzan. It appeared on Tarzan: An Original Walt Disney Records Soundtrack as well as various other Disney compilations. It won the Academy Award for Best Original Song, and became Collins' last US top 40 single, peaking at number 21.

A demo version with Collins playing piano and singing is featured as a bonus on the 2-DVD Special Edition of Tarzan, along with "I Will Follow", "Celebration", "6/8 Demo" and "Rhythm Piece" which became "Strangers Like Me", "Son of Man" and "Trashin' the Camp". "6/8 Demo" was not featured in the movie. The music video for the song was directed by Kevin Godley. Phil Collins also recorded the song in French ("Toujours dans mon cœur"), German ("Dir gehört mein Herz"), Italian ("Sei dentro me") and Spanish ("En mi corazón vivirás") aside from his native English. A version of the single performed by him with Glenn Close also appears on the soundtrack.

Production and context
Phil Collins was originally hired by Disney in 1995 as a songwriter, but was chosen because he was a drummer at first and given his history as a drummer for the rock band Genesis, Collins appealed to the Disney production crew, who "wanted a strong jungle beat to accompany Tarzan's adventures". Early into production, directors Kevin Lima and Chris Buck decided not to follow Disney's musical tradition by having the characters sing and instead, Phil Collins perform the songs in the film serving as the narrator. The choice of Collins, a popular and well established adult contemporary artist, led his ability to write and record the five original songs. This "ballad" is one of original songs he wrote for the film, and he ended up also performing this song as well.

The song, originally written for his daughter Lily, who was ten years old at the time, was called "Lullaby", is used in a scene when Tarzan's adoptive gorilla mother Kala sings that her baby should stop crying because she will protect him and keep him safe and warm. She says everything will be fine and she tells him that "you will be in my heart always". The song is about "how love is a bond that cannot be broken".

In the movie, the song ends on the first verse, the full version of the song on the soundtrack album notes that others don't understand why a mother and child who are so different can love each other. When destiny calls, the child is told he must be strong even if the parent is not with him. The song is one of only two songs within Disney's Tarzan to have a part performed by an actual character (the other being "Trashin' the Camp" which the character's role in the song can be classified as scat singing). The rest of the songs were performed by Collins himself and overlaid into the movie. The full song is finally played all together during the end credits.

In the 2006 stage version, the song is performed by Kala with the ensemble, while a reprise is performed by Merle Dandridge as Kala and Daniel Manche as Young Tarzan  when the latter "decides to join the human world". This was because the omniscience of Collins' songs did not translate too well, so the song along with "Two Worlds", "perform similar thematic and character introductions on stage".

International versions 

The entire Tarzan soundtrack, including "You'll Be in My Heart", was also performed by Phil Collins in various other languages besides his native English, namely German, French, Spanish and Italian. Most dubbings played the full English version of the song by Collins at the end credits but it has six versions in other languages and includes his full Spanish version that played for the European and Latin American dubbing, which marks Phil Collins' only appearance on Billboards Hot Latin Tracks, the song charting at number 32. He also performed the German version of "You'll Be in My Heart" on German TV.

In-popular culture 
Then-SM Rookies member Donghyuck, who later debut as a member of boy group NCT with the stage name Haechan performed the Korean song on the Disney Channel Korea show Mickey Mouse Club in 2015.

Critical reception and awards 
Manila Standard said Collins "waxes poetic" with the song.
 The Disney Song Encyclopedia deemed it an "uptempo ballad" and "tender song". American Musical Theatre: A Chronicle said that Merle Dandridge, who sang this song as the role of Tarzan's adoptive mother Kala in the Broadway version, had "the best song". American Literature on Stage and Screen: 525 Works and Their Adaptations said this song was "contemporary sounding yet [its] rhythmic momentum blended beautifully with the pulsating sounds of the jungle". Billboard said the song ran "in the same vein" as another Collins song "Can't Stop Loving You". Musical Experience in Our Lives: Things We Learn and Meanings We Make recounted a personal story of how the song has a special meaning to a mother/daughter relationship involving fetus-singing. Similar stories were recounted by two other sources.

Soon after the song was released, it was already "being touted as an Oscar contender". The song went on to win the Golden Globe Award for Best Original Song and the Academy Award for Best Original Song. Collins performed the song live at that year's ceremony. The song also received a Grammy Award nomination for Best Song Written for a Motion Picture, Television or Other Visual Media, but lost to Madonna's "Beautiful Stranger" from Austin Powers: The Spy Who Shagged Me.

Chart performance
"You'll Be in My Heart" spent nineteen non-consecutive weeks at number one on the Adult Contemporary charts ("the longest time ever up to that point") and peaked at number 21 on the U.S. Billboard Hot 100.  It was Collins's first top 40 hit on the Billboard Hot 100 since 1994's "Everyday", as well as his last Top 40 hit to date. The track peaked at number 17 on the UK Singles Chart, continuing his success that had not stopped after "Everyday".

Personnel
 Phil Collins – lead and backing vocals, drums
 Rob Cavallo – acoustic guitar
 Mark Goldenberg, Tim Pierce, Michael Thompson – electric guitar
 Jamie Muhoberac – acoustic piano, keyboards
 John Pierce – electric bass
 Luis Conte – percussion
 Kim Bullard, Carmen Rizzo – programming
 Will Donovan – additional percussion
 David Campbell – string arrangements

Movie version
 Joann Turovsky – harp
 Mark Mancina – arrangements
 Glenn Close – vocals

Charts

Weekly charts

Year-end charts

Certifications

See also
 List of number-one adult contemporary singles of 1999 (U.S.)

References

1999 songs
1999 singles
1990s ballads
Phil Collins songs
Pop ballads
Rock ballads
Best Original Song Golden Globe winning songs
Best Original Song Academy Award-winning songs
Songs from Disney's Tarzan
Disney Renaissance songs
Songs written by Phil Collins
Film theme songs
Animated series theme songs
Music videos directed by Kevin Godley
Song recordings produced by Phil Collins
Song recordings produced by Rob Cavallo
Lullabies
Walt Disney Records singles